During the 1995–96 English football season, Barnsley F.C. competed in the Football League First Division.

Season summary
In the 1995–96 season, Barnsley started brightly with 5 league wins from their first 9 games which saw them sit in 3rd place by around mid-September but their form faltered through the first half of the season afterwards and by Christmas, Barnsley sat in a lowly 15th place after winning just two from their next 14 league games onwards. From Boxing Day to the end of February, Barnsley went on a good run of form winning five of the next 9 league matches with just one defeat, which saw the Tykes in the playoff places and a top six finish seemed possible but again from there until the end of the season, their form faltered again winning two from their final 14 league games and ended the season in a disappointing 10th place, after being playoff contenders at one stage.

Final league table

Results
Barnsley's score comes first

Legend

Football League First Division

FA Cup

League Cup

Squad

References

Barnsley F.C. seasons
Barnsley